Heart of Hajduk is an annual football award established in 1994 and officially awarded by the Hajduk Split supporters' association Torcida Split to the Hajduk player of the year. 

The inaugural winner of the award was the midfielder Ante Miše, a key player in the squad which won the Croatian championship in the 1993–94 season. Two players have won the award twice, the striker Nenad Pralija in 1995 and 1996, and the goalkeeper Stipe Pletikosa in 2000 and 2002. Up to 2012, only three foreign players had received the award (Josip Skoko in 1998, Mirko Hrgović in 2007 and Senijad Ibričić in 2010), although they all hold Croatian citizenship. 

In 2006, the title was not awarded because, according to supporters' judgment, none of the players deserved it following a string of bad results in both domestic competitions which saw Hajduk, widely considered a powerhouse in Croatian football, finishing fifth in the national championship and exiting the 2005–06 Croatian Cup in the semi-finals.

In 2009, the club had initially struggled to find its form, but improved later in the season and eventually finished second in the championship and runners-up in the 2008–09 Croatian Cup (after coming back from a 3–0 defeat to their biggest rivals Dinamo Zagreb in the first leg and then losing the final in a penalty shootout). The supporters' frustration with yet another trophiless season was further increased when Hajduk went through much turmoil related to the transformation of the debt-ridden club into a public limited company in summer 2009. In addition, the team experienced a series of humiliating results at the beginning of the 2009–10 season, and this all led to the cancellation of the award for the second time. On 11 August 2011, the award was posthumously awarded to the legendary Hajduk manager Tomislav Ivić, who died in June 2011. In August 2012, Heart of Hajduk was awarded to the youth academy.

Winners

Names in bold indicate multiple winners.International caps correct as of 18 August 2022.

See also
Hajduk Split
Torcida Split

References

External links
Hajduk Split official website 
Torcida Split official website 
Heart of Hajduk at torcidakup.com 

Association football trophies and awards
Croatian awards
Awards established in 1994
HNK Hajduk Split
1994 establishments in Croatia